Roman ladders are an equilibristic circus skill where four or more people perform acrobatics on specially made ladders. The performers in the middle push the ladders out, while the performers on the outside of the ladders perform various poses and tricks.

External links
 Simply Circus: Roman Ladders — Steven Santos' instructional handbook about performing on the Roman ladders

Circus skills